Alexandre Duhaime, better known by his stage name Ale Dee, is a Canadian rapper. He had his beginnings in Mauricie region of Quebec with the musical group Chosen One (with Doris D and DJ Flavor). After Sir Pathétik joined in 2000, the name of the group was amended to Mine de rien.

Upon the disbanding of "Mine de rien", Ale Dee started a solo career. In March 2002, he had already won a second-place award "Hip Hop 4 Ever" event for "Francophone rap" category. The same year, he collaborated with Sir Pathétik in "S'pas normal". Another collaboration followed in 2006 with "T Town".

Ale Dee's first solo album was in 2006 and entitled Mine de rien, the name of his band. 
Ale Dee eventually signed with K.Pone.Inc for launching his second album in 2008 entitled Pour le love pis l'cash. The video clip for the main title track Pour le love pis l'cash launched in 2008 topped the MusiquePlus video charts.

Discography

Mixtapes
Mixtape dans la rue 2
Comme je suis

Albums

*The album was rereleased on Tacca Musique with slightly different track list including three more tracks, "La plus belle p**e", "Ale Diss" and "Avec nous" not found on the 2010 release, at the same time replacing three of the original album, namely "Party", "Cash" and "Rap Game".

Singles
 "Elle" (feat. Prinz Ali) 
 "Une place à côté de toi" 
 "Mes dues" 
 "Pour le love pis l'cash" 
 "Put Em Up" (2010)
 "La femme de ma vie" (feat. Miray) (2011)

Collaborations
Ale Dee has collaborated with a number of artists:
He is featured on T Town and on S'pas normal both by Sir Pathétik
His song Elle features Prinz Ali, Get The Money features Mista Tee and Tu peux nous voir features Chaplin.
Ale Dee's Garde Confiance features Online
His song "La femme de ma vie" features Miray

Awards and nominations
At the Gala for SOBA (Sounds of Blackness Awards), he was nominated for "Choice of Public of MusiquePlus
In 2002, he came 2nd at the "Hip Hop 4 Ever" event in the Francophone Rap category

References

External links
Ale Dee Official website
Ale Dee MySpace website
Hip Hop Quebec Ale Dee page

Year of birth missing (living people)
Living people
Place of birth missing (living people)
Canadian male rappers
21st-century Canadian rappers
Musicians from Trois-Rivières
French Quebecers
21st-century Canadian male musicians